Michael Brand may refer to:
 Mihály Mosonyi (born Michael Brand, 1815–1870), Hungarian composer
 Michael Brand (composer) (born 1952), English orchestral conductor and composer
 Michael Brand (art historian) (born 1958), Australian art historian and museum director
 Michael Brand (politician) (born 1973), German politician